Adrantus, or Ardrantus or Adrastus, was a contemporary of Athenaeus in the 2nd or 3rd-century AD who wrote a commentary in five books upon the work of Theophrastus, entitled , to which he added a sixth book upon the Nicomachean Ethics of Aristotle.

References

Sources
 

Ancient Greek essayists